Teal is an extinct town in Cole County, in the U.S. state of Missouri.

A post office called Teal was established in 1880, and remained in operation until 1912. The community was named after the teal duck.

References

Ghost towns in Missouri
Former populated places in Cole County, Missouri